Hot Topic, Inc. (stylized as HOT TOPIC) is an American retail chain specializing in counterculture-related clothing and accessories, as well as licensed music. The stores are aimed towards an audience interested in rock music and video gaming, and most of their audience ranges from teens to young adults. Approximately 40% of Hot Topic's revenue comes from sales of licensed band T-shirts. Hot Topic often negotiates exclusive licensing arrangements with musical artists, movie studios, and graphic artists.  The majority of the stores are located in regional shopping malls.

History

The first Hot Topic store was opened in November 1989 in Montclair Plaza, Montclair, California, by Orv Madden, a former executive at The Children's Place, who retired as CEO in 2000 and was replaced by Betsy McLaughlin, who headed the company until 2011.  Lisa Harper assumed the position of CEO in March 2011 until Steve Vranes was announced as the new CEO in 2016. The company went public and began trading on NASDAQ in 1996.

In 2013, Hot Topic announced its sale to private equity firm Sycamore Partners for $600 million.

Product assortment and sales

The store has been through a number of phases in its history, reflective of various alternative culture and pop culture (including geek culture) trends (prime examples being Lolita, goth, or cosplay outfits). In the early 2000s, the store was known for heavily marketing nu-metal merchandise relating to bands. During that period, the store was also known for its sales of controversial gel bracelets (often rumored to be "sex bracelets") as well as the equally controversial styles of phat pants-inspired bondage pants popular among teenagers in the late 1990s and early-to-mid 2000s.

The store later focused on skinny jeans and merchandise related to scene, emo and hardcore punk music and fashion, with a much larger focus on goths and spiky chokers and clothing. At present, the store's selection is largely focused on licensed video game merchandise and internet memes popular on sites such as tumblr, as well as anime, manga, Japanese films, and the associated otaku subculture.

Ventures
Hot Topic launched Torrid, a concept store that sells clothing for plus-size women, in 2001. While still under the same parent umbrella as Hot Topic, in 2015 the company branched off to become Torrid, LLC.

In 2008, Hot Topic launched ShockHound, an online retailer and social networking music site. In March 2011, Hot Topic made a public statement announcing the shutdown of ShockHound. The site is no longer live, all merchandise was moved to HotTopic.com, and the company ceased sales of MP3s.

In August 2010, Hot Topic opened two new stores in Canada, which also marked the chain's first two international outlets. The first store opened on August 11 at Square One Shopping Centre in Mississauga, Ontario, and then at Scarborough Town Centre in Toronto, Ontario the following day. The company has since also opened additional Canadian locations as well as locations in Puerto Rico.

In 2012, Hot Topic launched Blackheart Lingerie, a concept store that sells lingerie and clothing for women.

On May 26, 2015, Hot Topic announced its intent to acquire Geeknet Inc., owner of the online retailer ThinkGeek, for $122 million. However, the company received a $140 million counter-offer from GameStop, which Hot Topic did not choose to exceed.

On October 14, 2015, Hot Topic launched BoxLunch, a gift and novelty retail store. For every $10 spent, a meal is donated to a person in need.

Tour sponsorship
The company sponsored the 2004 Ozzfest concert tour, the 2005 through 2007 Sounds of the Underground tour, the 2008 Taste of Chaos tour, and had a stage at and sponsored the 2008 and 2009 Rockstar Energy Drink Mayhem Festival tours. The company went on to sponsor Black Veil Brides 2014 Black Mass tour with special guests Falling in Reverse.

References

External links

 

2000s fashion
2010s fashion
Companies based in the City of Industry, California
American companies established in 1989
Clothing companies established in 1989
Retail companies established in 1989
2013 mergers and acquisitions
Companies formerly listed on the Nasdaq
Clothing retailers of the United States
Goth subculture
Retail companies based in California
1989 establishments in California
1996 initial public offerings
Novelty items